The 2009 Women's NORCECA Volleyball Championship was the 21st edition of the Women's Continental Volleyball Tournament, there eight countries competed from September 22 to September 27, 2009, in Bayamón, Puerto Rico. The top finisher qualified for the 2009 FIVB Women's World Grand Champions Cup in Japan.

Competing Nations

Squads

Preliminary round

Group A

|}

Tuesday September 22, 2009

Wednesday September 23, 2009

Thursday September 24, 2009

Group B

|}

Tuesday September 22, 2009

Wednesday September 23, 2009

Thursday September 24, 2009

Final round

Championship bracket

5th-8th bracket

Quarterfinals
Friday September 25

Semifinals
Saturday September 26 — 5th/8th place

Saturday September 26 — 1st/4th place

Finals
Sunday September 27 — Seventh Place Match

Sunday September 27 — Fifth Place Match

Sunday September 27 — Bronze Medal Match

Sunday September 27 — Gold Medal Match

Final ranking

Dominican Republic qualified for the 2009 FIVB World Grand Champions

Cup

Individual awards
Winners:

Most Valuable Player

Best Scorer

Best Spiker

Best Blocker

Best Server

Best Digger

Best Setter

Best Receiver

Best Libero

Rising Star

References

External links
Fixtures and results

Women's NORCECA Volleyball Championship
NORCECA Women
NORCECA Women
Volleyball